
Gmina Grabowiec is a rural gmina (administrative district) in Zamość County, Lublin Voivodeship, in eastern Poland.

The gmina contains part of the protected area called Skierbieszów Landscape Park.

Villages
Gmina Grabowiec contains the villages and settlements of Bereść, Bronisławka, Cieszyn, Czechówka, Dańczypol, Grabowczyk, Grabowiec, Grabowiec-Góra, Henrykówka, Hołużne, Majdan Tuczępski, Ornatowice, Ornatowice-Kolonia, Rogów, Siedlisko, Skibice, Skomorochy Duże, Skomorochy Małe, Szczelatyn, Szystowice, Tuczępy, Wolica Uchańska, Wólka Tuczępska and Żurawlów.

Neighbouring gminas
Gmina Grabowiec is bordered by the gminas of Kraśniczyn, Miączyn, Sitno, Skierbieszów, Trzeszczany, Uchanie and Wojsławice.

References

Polish official population figures 2006

Grabowiec
Zamość County